Polygala hookeri is a species of flowering plant in the milkwort family (Polygalaceae). It is endemic to Alabama.

References 

hookeri